Universal Pulse is a mini-LP and the tenth studio album by American rock band 311, released on July 19, 2011 on 311 Records/ATO Records. It clocks in at almost 29 minutes, making it the shortest album 311 ever released, as well as their first release on their own independent record company. It has a 57 out of 100 on Metacritic, indicating "mixed or average reviews".

Album information
Like its predecessor, Uplifter, this album was produced by Bob Rock, who has produced or engineered albums by numerous notable acts, such as Metallica, Aerosmith, Mötley Crüe, Bon Jovi, The Cult, Our Lady Peace and The Offspring. Unlike previous albums where their record label requested that the drums be recorded at an alternate location, all tracks, including the drums, were recorded at the Hive Studio. To support the album, 311 invited Sublime with Rome to co-headline the 2011 Unity Tour, with special guests DJ Soulman and DJ Trichrome. The artwork was done by Sonny Kay. With only eight songs and clocking within less than thirty minutes, it's their shortest album to date.

The album's first single "Sunset in July" was released on June 3, 2011. The album's second single "Count Me In" was released on October 4, 2011.

Reception

Allmusic editor Stephen Thomas Erlewine gave Universal Pulse a 2.5/5, commenting "Within the sharp relief of Bob Rock’s immaculate production, this can mean that the fuzz-toned guitars and crunching riffs are strenuously underlined: they are the foundation of this unusually rock-oriented 311 album yet in this crystal-clear atmosphere they drill, not pummel." and concludes that "Universal Pulse can be wearying even at its half-hour length." Consequence of Sound gave the album a 3.5/5 and declares that it's the band's best album since From Chaos, saying "Once this album has completed its first full rotation, there’s an immediate urge to play it again. It’s short, sweet, and a perfect follow-up to where the band was in 2009."

Track listing

Charts

Personnel
Credits adapted from album’s liner notes.

311
 Nick Hexum – vocals, rhythm guitar
 Doug "SA" Martinez – vocals
 Tim Mahoney – lead guitar
 P-Nut – bass
 Chad Sexton – drums, mixing

Production
Bob Rock – producer, engineer
Giff Tripp – engineer
Joe Gastwirt – mastering
Jason Walters – studio manager

References

External links
 

311 (band) albums
2011 albums
Albums produced by Bob Rock